Nitrianska Streda is a municipality in the Topoľčany District of the Nitra Region, Slovakia. In 2011 it had 731 inhabitants.

References

External links
Nitrianska Streda
Official homepage

Villages and municipalities in Topoľčany District